The 2021–22 Moldovan National Division was the 31st season of top-tier football in Moldova. The season started on 1 July 2021 and ended on 14 May 2022. Sheriff Tiraspol were the defending champions. The winners of the league this season earned a spot in the first qualifying round of the 2022–23 UEFA Champions League, and the second, third and fourth placed clubs earned a place in the first qualifying round of the 2022–23 UEFA Europa Conference League.

Teams
A total of 8 teams are competing in the league. These include 7 teams from the 2020–21 season and one promoted team from the "A" Division: Bălți.

Changes
Bălți (promoted after a two-year absence) were promoted from the "A" Division. Dacia Buiucani (relegated after one year in the top flight) and Codru Lozova (relegated after two years in the top flight) were relegated to "A" Division. Additionally, Speranța Nisporeni were expelled from the league, and thus ending their six-year stay in the top flight.

Managerial changes

League table

Results
Teams played each other four times (twice at home, twice away).

Rounds 1−14

Rounds 15−28

Positions by round

Results by round
The following table represents the teams game results in each round.

Relegation play-off
A play-off match was played between the seventh-placed team from Divizia Națională and the fourth-placed team from Divizia A for one place in the next season. The "home" team (for administrative purposes) was determined in a draw held on 19 May 2022.

Season statistics

Top goalscorers

Hat-tricks

Top assists

Clean sheets

Notes

References

External links
 Official website
 uefa.com

Moldovan Super Liga seasons
Moldova 1
2021–22 in Moldovan football